Katlego Abel Mphela (born 29 November 1984) is a South African retired professional footballer who played as a forward.

Club career
Mphela, a product of Jomo Cosmos, played in France for RC Strasbourg Alsace and Stade de Reims, both with limited success.

After returning home he turned out for SuperSport United for the 2007–08 season before joining Mamelodi Sundowns the following season. He then finished the 2009–10 season with 17 goals in 30 games which made him the league's top goalscorer. He won the Lesley Manyathela Golden Boot and was voted PSL Players' Player of the Season.

Mphela joined Chiefs in 2014. He made his debut in a 2–2 draw against Maritzburg United. He scored his first goal for Chiefs against Free State Stars but it was cancelled out almost immediately in a 1–1 draw. Mphela scored on the last league match of the season in the 55th minute against AmaZulu in a 3–0 win.

After two years out of action, 34-year old Mphela announced his retirement in August 2019. He also announced, that he would begin as a coach and that he already was coaching youth players.

International career
Mphela scored a brace on his debut for the South Africa national team against Seychelles on 26 February 2005.

He has represented South Africa 53 times, scoring 23 goals. He scored South Africa's only goal in the 3–1 defeat against Tunisia in the 2008 African Nations Cup.

Perhaps Mphela's greatest moment came in the 2009 FIFA Confederations Cup third-place playoff against Spain. Coming in as a substitute Mphela produced arguably the goal of the tournament with a free kick from 30 yards, which turned out to be the last action of the 90 mins, sending the game into extra time.

Mphela was included in South Africa's 23-man final squad for the 2010 World Cup. He played in the inaugural match against Mexico, which ended 1–1. Next, the Bafana Bafana played against Uruguay, but they lost the game 3–0. In their final group game, he scored the 2nd goal in a 2–1 win against France as South Africa exited the competition.

Mphela opened the scoring in South Africa's first international match following the 2010 World Cup putting South Africa up 1–0 against Ghana.

Mphela scored the winner for South Africa against Egypt in the 93rd minute with a perfect finish that saw the North Africans beaten by South Africa for the first time in competitive football between the two countries and increased the hopes of qualification.

Mphela also participated in the 2013 African Cup of Nations tournament.

Style of play
His style of play includes challenging defenders with both pace and strength but he can still play deep as a supporting striker. He is nicknamed "Killer" for his finishing ability.

Career statistics

International goals
Scores and results list South Africa's goal tally first, score column indicates score after each Mphela goal.

References

External links
 
 
 

1984 births
Living people
People from Brits, North West
South African soccer players
Association football forwards
South Africa international soccer players
2009 FIFA Confederations Cup players
2006 Africa Cup of Nations players
2008 Africa Cup of Nations players
Jomo Cosmos F.C. players
South African expatriate soccer players
Expatriate footballers in France
RC Strasbourg Alsace players
South African expatriate sportspeople in France
Stade de Reims players
SuperSport United F.C. players
Mamelodi Sundowns F.C. players
Kaizer Chiefs F.C. players
2010 FIFA World Cup players
2013 Africa Cup of Nations players
Sportspeople from North West (South African province)